The Second Ruijs de Beerenbrouck cabinet was the cabinet of the Netherlands from 18 September 1922 until 4 August 1925. The cabinet was formed by the political parties Roman Catholic State Party (RKSP), Anti-Revolutionary Party (ARP) and the Christian Historical Union (CHU) after the election of 1922. The centre-right cabinet was a majority government in the House of Representatives and was a continuation of the previous Cabinet Ruijs de Beerenbrouck I. It was the second of three cabinets of Charles Ruijs de Beerenbrouck, the Leader of the Roman Catholic State Party as Prime Minister.

Cabinet Members

 Retained this position from the previous cabinet.
 Resigned.

References

External links
Official

  Kabinet-Ruijs de Beerenbrouck II Parlement & Politiek

Cabinets of the Netherlands
1922 establishments in the Netherlands
1925 disestablishments in the Netherlands
Cabinets established in 1922
Cabinets disestablished in 1925